The 1912–13 Swiss National Ice Hockey Championship was the fifth edition of the national ice hockey championship in Switzerland. Four teams participated in the championship, which was won by HC Levants, who finished first in the final standings.

Final standings

External links 
Swiss Ice Hockey Federation – All-time results

National
Swiss National Ice Hockey Championship seasons